Jordan vs. Bird: One on One is a 1988 basketball video game developed by Electronic Arts. It was released for the Commodore 64, DOS, Game Boy, Sega Genesis, NES. It was also available as a Tiger Handheld Electronic Game. It is the sequel to One on One: Dr. J vs. Larry Bird.

Gameplay
Michael Jordan of the Chicago Bulls and Larry Bird of the Boston Celtics are the only two players in the game, which allows the player to participate in a one-on-one basketball game, as either Bird or Jordan. Mini-games include a slam dunk contest (utilizing Jordan) and a three-point contest (utilizing Bird).

Reception

Mega placed the game at #7 in their list of the "10 Worst Mega Drive Games of All Time". Mean Machines magazine gave the game an overall score of 40 out of 100, faulting all aspects of the game other than sound and presentation while concluding that the game is "A substandard sports simulation that won't even appeal to basketball fans."

References

External links
Jordan vs Bird: One on One at videogamecritic.net
Games time forgot: Jordan vs Bird: One on One at destructoid.com
Jordan vs Bird: One on One at NES Guide
Jordan vs Bird: One on One at atarihq.com
Jordan VS Bird: One on One at MobyGames.com

1988 video games
Basketball video games
Commodore 64 games
DOS games
Electronic Arts games
Game Boy games
Sega Genesis games
Nintendo Entertainment System games
Cultural depictions of Michael Jordan
Cultural depictions of basketball players
Video games based on real people
Video games featuring black protagonists
Video games scored by David Wise
Video games scored by Rob Hubbard
Video games developed in the United States
Milton Bradley Company video games